Woo Won-jae (born December 23, 1996), also known as Woo, is a South Korean rapper. In 2017, he released his debut single "We Are" which had commercial success and widespread acclaim. He has released one studio album: Black Out (2020) one EP: af (2018). He is currently signed to hip hop label AOMG.

Career

2017-2018: Show Me the Money 6, signing with AOMG and af
In 2017, Woo participated in Show Me the Money 6, where he finished in third place. He gained a lot of popularity through the show.

Woo made his debut through releasing a single "We Are", featuring Gray and Loco on September 4, 2017. The single was meant for Woo's final 2 stage in the finals of Show Me The Money 6, but he was eliminated in the top 3 round. The song was a very huge success as it made a successful all-kill in numerous Korean charts.

On October 31, it was announced that Woo has signed with hip hop label AOMG. Following the signing, he released a single album titled "Anxiety" on November 2.

Woo released his first EP "af" on November 22, 2018, with the title track "a fence". One of the tracks in the EP, titled "Cash", was pre-released on November 16.

2020: Black Out
Woo released his first studio album "Black Out" on August 18. The album included a pre-release single titled "Used To", which was released on August 11.

2022: comma
Woo released his second EP "comma" on November 24.

Artistry 
i-D wrote that "Having spoken publicly about his struggle with anxiety and panic attacks, Woo’s lyrics are just as honest and open as he is – from not being afraid to get dark when expressing his feelings, to revealing details of a romantic relationship."

Philanthropy 
On March 8, 2022, Woo donated  million to the Hope Bridge Disaster Relief Association to help those affected by the massive wildfires that started in Uljin, Gyeongbuk. and also spread to Samcheok, Gangwon.

Discography

Studio albums

Extended plays

Singles

Filmography

Television

Web shows

Awards and nominations

References

External links

South Korean male rappers
1996 births
Show Me the Money (South Korean TV series) contestants
Living people